Jay Dee Patton (September 16, 1907 – December 24, 1975) was an American college football player, World War II veteran, and printer.

Early years
Patton was born on September 16, 1907, to Wade Hampton Patton and Agnes née Self. Patton attended Hume-Fogg High School in Nashville, Tennessee.

College football
Patton was a prominent tackle for the Sewanee Tigers of Sewanee:The University of the South, a member of the school's All-time football team. He was selected All-Southern in 1931.  He also later officiated some games.

He was also an All-American in 1931 while at Sewanee.

He went on to play for the Staten Island Stapes, a football team that failed during the Great Depression. He also played for the Richmond Arrows.

World War II
Jay Dee served as a lieutenant colonel in the cavalry of the U.S. Armed Forces during World War II. Neil Edmond, an earlier Sewanee player, was the same rank.

Richmond
After the war he moved to Richmond, Virginia, where he ran a printing business and also ran the Virginia State Penitentiary printing press. He established his own printing consulting firm in 1952.

He married Florence "Billie" Boward and had one son, Jay Dee Patton, Jr.

References

External links

1907 births
1975 deaths
Players of American football from Nashville, Tennessee
Sewanee Tigers football players
Players of American football from Richmond, Virginia
All-Southern college football players
American football tackles
Printers
American football officials